The Thomas W. Jones House is a historic house at 34 Warren Street in Stoneham, Massachusetts.  It is Stoneham's best preserved Second Empire house, preserving significant external details, and its carriage house.  The two-story wood-frame house has a T shape, and features a bracketed porch and cornice, gable screens, paneled pilasters, and oriel windows.  The house was built for Thomas W. Jones, who built the last major shoe factory in Stoneham.

The house was listed on the National Register of Historic Places in 1984.

See also
National Register of Historic Places listings in Stoneham, Massachusetts
National Register of Historic Places listings in Middlesex County, Massachusetts

References

Houses in Stoneham, Massachusetts
Houses on the National Register of Historic Places in Stoneham, Massachusetts
Second Empire architecture in Massachusetts
Houses completed in 1878